Lee County Sheriff's Office may refer to:

 Lee County Sheriff's Office (Florida)
 Lee County Sheriff's Office (Virginia)